The 1982 Women's Lacrosse World Cup was the first Women's Lacrosse World Cup and was played at Trent Bridge in Nottingham from September 20–26, 1982. USA defeated Australia in the final to win the tournament. 

The tournament was organised by the Great Britain Lacrosse Council on behalf of the International Federation of Women’s Lacrosse Association (IFWLA) and sponsored by Brine.

Results

Table

Fifth Place Play Off (Sep 25)
England v Wales

Third Place Play Off (Sep 25)
Scotland v Canada

Final (Sep 25)
United States v Australia 10-7 (ET)

References

2009 Women's
1982 in lacrosse
Lacrosse World Cup